Porcellio dilatatus (Commonly known as the Giant canyon isopod) is a species of woodlouse in the genus Porcellio belonging to the family Porcellionidae. This species is widespread in Europe, and has also been introduced to North America from Western Europe. They can be found feeding on alder leaves, but mostly feeds on organic food substrates, such as lettuce (Lactuca sativa) in the wild. It also feeds on inorganic metal salts.

Pests
The species are considered to be house pests, that can be found in greenhouses, seed boxes, and flower pots.

Subspecies
Five subspecies are recognised:
Porcellio dilatatus bonadonai Vandel, 1951
Porcellio dilatatus dilatatus Brandt, 1833
Porcellio dilatatus flavus Collinge, 1917
Porcellio dilatatus petiti Vandel, 1951
Porcellio dilatatus rufobrunneus Collinge, 1918

References

Porcellionidae
Crustaceans described in 1833
Woodlice of Europe